Richard H. Demers is an American politician who served as mayor of Chicopee, Massachusetts, and was a member of the Massachusetts House of Representatives.

Early life
Demers was born on January 19, 1928, in Chicopee. He attended Chicopee High School, Holyoke Community College, and the Western New England University School of Law.

Political career
Demers began his career as a member of the Chicopee board of assessors. In 1967, he defeated his fellow assessor Walter Olbrych by 13,668 votes to 9,156 to succeed the retiring Edward A. Lysek as mayor of Chicopee. It was the first time in Olbrych's 22 years in public office that he had been defeated. In 1969, Demers was re-elected. He defeated his predecessor, Edward A. Lysek, by over 6,700 votes. In 1971, Demers was defeated by city treasurer Edward J. Ziemba by 14,760 votes to 7,793.

From 1971 to 1981, Demers was a member of the Massachusetts House of Representatives.

References

1928 births
2004 deaths
Mayors of Chicopee, Massachusetts
Democratic Party members of the Massachusetts House of Representatives
Western New England University alumni
Holyoke Community College alumni
Massachusetts lawyers